OpenRoad Brewery is a brewery and tap room in Wayland, Michigan. OpenRoad brews a variety of craft beers, including the Road Rage Double IPA, I.P.A. Lot, Citradisiac Pale Ale, My Coffee Stout, Bumpy Ride Brown, 90 mph IPA, Pennywise Porter, Good Rye-Brations IPA, Yell-Ale Submarine and Campout Cream Ale. Several seasonal and experimental brews are planned.  The brewery opened in 2016.

References

External links

Beer brewing companies based in Michigan
American companies established in 2016
2016 establishments in Michigan